Eudonia rhombias is a moth of the family Crambidae. It is endemic to the Hawaiian islands of Kauai, Oahu and Molokai.

External links

Eudonia
Endemic moths of Hawaii
Moths described in 1899